This list of castles in the Île-de-France is a list of medieval castles or château forts in the region in northern France.

Links in italics are links to articles in the French Wikipedia.

Essonne

Hauts-de-Seine

Castles of which little or nothing remains include 
Château La Boursidière.

Paris

Castles of which little or nothing remains include 
The Bastille,
The Louvre,
The Temple and 
Château de la Tournelle.

Seine-et-Marne

Seine-Saint-Denis

-

Val-de-Marne

Val-d'Oise

Yvelines

See also
 List of castles in France
 List of châteaux in France

References

Ile-de-France